1988–89 Albanian Cup was the thirty-seventh season of Albania's annual cup competition. It began in August 1988 with the First Round and ended in May 1989 with the Final match. The winners of the competition qualified for the 1989-90 first round of the UEFA Cup. Flamurtari were the defending champions, having won their second Albanian Cup last season. The cup was won by Dinamo Tirana.

The first round was played in a single round-robin matches within 4 qualifying groups. The other rounds were played in a two-legged format similar to those of European competitions. If the aggregated score was tied after both games, the team with the higher number of away goals advanced. If the number of away goals was equal in both games, the match was decided by extra time and a penalty shootout, if necessary.

First round
Games were played on August & September 1988

Group A

Group B

Group C

Group D

Quarter-finals
In this round entered the 8 winners from the previous round.

|}

Semi-finals
In this round entered the four winners from the previous round.

|}

Final

Replay

References

 Calcio Mondiale Web

External links
 Official website 

Cup
1988–89 domestic association football cups
1988-89